The Banking, Insurance and General Workers Union (BIGWU) is a trade union in Trinidad and Tobago. It was formed on 21 February 2003 out of a merger between the Bank and General Workers Union and the Bank Employees' Union. The two prior Unions were both formed in 1974.

As its name suggests, most of its members are employed in the finance sector but in particular at the First Citizens Bank, the Republic Bank, the Central Bank of Trinidad and Tobago and credit unions. It is the largest union in finance sector in Trinidad and Tobago.

See also

 List of trade unions

Trade unions in Trinidad and Tobago
Finance sector trade unions